Scapterus is a genus of beetles in the family Carabidae, containing the following species:

 Scapterus crenatus (Fabricius, 1792)
 Scapterus guerini Dejean, 1826
 Scapterus riparius Gestro, 1883
 Scapterus stevensi Andrewes, 1929
 Scapterus sulcatus Putzeys, 1861

References

Scaritinae